Omensight is an action role-playing game developed and published by Canadian studio Spearhead Games, and is the spiritual successor to Stories: The Path of Destinies and set in the same universe as its spiritual predecessor. It was released for Microsoft Windows and PlayStation 4 on May 15, 2018, the Nintendo Switch on December 13, 2018, and the Xbox One on June 7, 2019.

Described by the developer as an "Action Murder Mystery" game, the player primarily takes the role of the Harbinger, a mythical warrior who only appears in times of great crisis, and as a dark god destroys the world of war-torn Urralia. In order to save the world, the Harbinger must use their Omensight power to go back in time, reliving the final day to investigate a series of events that led to the murder of the priestess Vera. The Harbinger comes across four other companion characters which are the key to solving the crisis which consists of Ludomir, an alcoholic but powerful rodentian freedom fighter and Vera's brother, Draga, the studious and honorable general of the Pygarian Army, Ratika, a cool and sardonic magical bard and leader of the Rodentian Forces and Indrik, the ruthless and impatient Emperor of Pygaria. She will not hesitate to kill any of them if they get in the way of her investigation or obtaining vital information to solve the murder and stop the apocalypse.

Reception 
Omensight received "generally positive" and "mixed or average" reviews according to review aggregator Metacritic.

References

External links
 

2018 video games
Action role-playing video games
Nintendo Switch games
PlayStation 4 games
PlayStation Network games
Unreal Engine games
Video games about time travel
Video games developed in Canada
Windows games
Xbox One games